Brad Yue Yi Xing (born 11 January 2002) is a Hong Kong professional footballer who currently plays for Hong Kong Premier League club HKFC.

Career statistics

Club

Notes

References

External links
 Yau Yee Football League profile
 Brad Yue at the University of San Francisco

Living people
2002 births
People from Kowloon
University of San Francisco alumni
Hong Kong footballers
Association football forwards
Hong Kong Premier League players
Hong Kong FC players